Eberhard Knobloch (born 6 November 1943, in Görlitz) is a German historian of science and mathematics.

Career 

From 1962 to 1967 Knobloch studied classics and mathematics at the University of Berlin and the Technical University of Berlin, after which he passed his state examination as a high school teacher and even as a high school teacher in ancient languages at Goethe began high school in Berlin before 1970 as a research assistant in the history of science back to the TU Berlin was, where he in 1972 with a thesis on Leibniz's combinatorial in Scriba, Christoph received his doctorate.

From 1973 he was professor of mathematics at the College of Education in Berlin . In 1976 he qualified as a professor in Berlin and was a visiting scholar at Oxford, London and Edinburgh. Since 1976 he is head of the math sections of the Academy edition of the works of Gottfried Wilhelm Leibniz (and later the technical-scientific parts). In 1981 he became professor of history of science at the Technical University of Berlin (since 2002 academy professor); retiring in 2009. In 1984 he was a visiting professor at the Russian Academy of Sciences in Leningrad. Since 1999 he has been a regular guest professor at Northwestern Polytechnical University in Xian, China. He also was a visiting professor at the Ecole Normale Supérieure in Paris.

Besides the Leibniz Edition, he also oversaw the Tschirnhaus edition of the Saxon Academy of Sciences and worked at Kepler with edition. He is also director of the Alexander von Humboldt Research Centre of the Berlin-Brandenburg Academy of Sciences. He also dealt with Renaissance technology (such as military engineer Mariano Taccola), the notebooks of Leonhard Euler and Jesuit scholars like Christopher Clavius.
Knobloch assisted the Dieter Lelgemann surveyors to decode and interpret the Ptolemy chart with Susudata. 

He is a member of the International Academy of the History of Science in Paris (corresponding member since 1984, member since 1988, 2001 to 2005 as Vice President and later its president). Since 1996, a member of the Leopoldina, corresponding member of the Saxon Academy of Sciences, Member of Academia Scientiarum et Artium Europaea since 1997 and the Berlin-Brandenburg Academy of Sciences . From 2001 to 2005 he was president of the German National Committee for the History of Science. In 2006 he became president of the European Society for the History of Science.

Writings 

 "The mathematical studies of G.W. Leibniz on combinatorics". Studia Leibnitiana Supplements vol.11, 1973.
 "The beginning of the theory of determinants. Leibniz posthumous studies on determinants of calculus". Hildesheim in 1980, Arbor Scientiarum B, Vol.2.
 L'art de la guerre : Machines et stratagèmes de Taccola, ingénieur de la Renaissance, coll. "Découvertes Gallimard Albums", Paris: Gallimard, 1992.
 with Folkerts, Karin Reich : Mass, number and weight: Mathematics is the key to world understanding and world domination. Wiesbaden 2001.
 Johannes Kepler: Nova stereometria doliorum vinariorum / New solid geometry of wine barrels. Accessit stereometriæ Archimedeæ supplementum / A supplement to the Archimedean solid geometry has been added. Edited and translated, with an Introduction, by Eberhard Knobloch. Paris: Les Belles Lettres, 2018. ISBN 978-2-251-44832-9.

References 
The information in this article is based on that in its German equivalent.

External links

1943 births
German historians of mathematics
Living people
Members of the European Academy of Sciences and Arts
Academic staff of the Technical University of Berlin
Members of the German Academy of Sciences Leopoldina